Fernando Lazaro Aenlle-Rocha (born 1961) is a United States district judge of the United States District Court for the Central District of California and former California state court judge.

Early life and career 

Aenlle-Rocha earned his Bachelor of Arts from Princeton University in 1983 and his Juris Doctor from the UC Berkeley School of Law in 1986. He began his career as a deputy district attorney in the Los Angeles County District Attorney's office. From 1990–1994, he was an Assistant United States Attorney for the Southern District of Florida. In 1994, he moved back to California and became an Assistant United States Attorney for the Central District of California. In 1999, Aenlle-Rocha entered private practice as an associate with Stephan, Oringher, Richman & Theodora in Los Angeles. In 2000, he became a partner at McDermott Will & Emery. From 2005–2017, Aenlle-Rocha was a partner at White & Case, where he focused on business litigation, white collar criminal defense, and business crimes investigations. He was appointed by California Governor Jerry Brown to the Los Angeles County Superior Court in 2017, where he served until becoming a federal judge.

Federal judicial service 

On August 28, 2019, President Donald Trump announced his intent to nominate Aenlle-Rocha to serve as a United States district judge of the United States District Court for the Central District of California. On October 17, 2019, his nomination was sent to the Senate. President Trump nominated Aenlle-Rocha to the seat vacated by Judge S. James Otero, who assumed senior status on December 30, 2018. A hearing on his nomination before the Senate Judiciary Committee was held on December 4, 2019. On January 3, 2020, his nomination was returned to the President under Rule XXXI, Paragraph 6 of the United States Senate. On January 9, 2020, he was renominated to the same seat. On March 5, 2020, his nomination was reported out of committee by voice vote. On December 20, 2020, the Senate invoked cloture on his nomination by an 82–7 vote. On December 20, 2020, the Senate confirmed his nomination by an 80–8 vote. He received his judicial commission on December 22, 2020.

References

External links 
 

|-

1961 births
Living people
20th-century American lawyers
21st-century American lawyers
21st-century American judges
Assistant United States Attorneys
California lawyers
California state court judges
Hispanic and Latino American judges
Judges of the United States District Court for the Central District of California
People from Havana
Superior court judges in the United States
UC Berkeley School of Law alumni
United States district court judges appointed by Donald Trump
American judges of Cuban descent